Vishva Nath Attri is an Indian professor chair in Indian Ocean Studies (CIOS), Indian Ocean Rim Association (IORA), University of Mauritius. He is the former Senior Fellow of Indian Council of Social Science Research, Government of India.

Attri is also the visiting scholar at University of California, Los Angeles and The George Washington University, USA.

Education and career
Attri has done Master of Arts (Economics) and obtained his Ph.D. (Economics) from Kurukshetra University. He was also Post doctoral research Visiting scholar at University of California, Los Angeles and The George Washington University.

Attri's policy briefs have been published in the United Nations Global Sustainable Development Reports in 2015; 2016; 2019. He is the founder and managing editor of Journal at Indian Ocean Rim Studies (JIORS), IORA.

Attri is also the founder chairman of Blue Economy Forum at the University of Mauritius, Republic of Mauritius. He is a lead editor with the Human Sciences Research Council, on the Blue Economy Handbook. He has participated in IORA's Core Group Meetings and First Ministerial Conference on the Blue Economy. He was also appointed by FICCI, India as a Member in the First Blue Economy Task Force in 2016 and the reconstituted Blue Economy Task Force (BETF) in 2018.

In 2017,  Attri has completed "The Study on Bilateral and Regional Trade and Investment related to Agreements and Dialogues between Member States".

In March 2018, The World Bank acknowledged him as an expert on Blue Economy and was invited to make an external review of the report, "Toward a Blue Economy: Pathways and Prospects for Bangladesh’s Investment in Sustainable Growth". In the same year he participated in the 5th Indian Ocean Dialogue (IOD) in Durban, South Africa for better relation between the two countries.

Publication
Attri has published on trade, sustainable development, International Environmental Regulation and the Blue economy.

The Blue Economy Handbook of the Indian Ocean Region (2018)
IORA Blue Economy and Sustainable Development: lessons from MDG & Pathway for SDG’ was published in the book "Towards Sustainable Development: Lessons from MDGs and pathways for SDGs", The Institute for Policy, Advocacy and Governance (IPAG), Dhaka 1205, Bangladesh, October 2017. 
"IORA's Past Present and Future", Published by University of Mauritius Reduit  2021

References

Indian academics
Academic staff of the University of Mauritius
Kurukshetra University alumni
Living people
Year of birth missing (living people)